Mercedes Benz sign is a radiological sign seen due to the presence of gallstones. It is a triradiate shadow, characteristic of the Mercedes-Benz automobile trademark. The sign occurs due to the gas fissuring within the gallstone.

References

Radiologic signs